The Brooklyn Tip-Tops were a team in the short-lived Federal League of professional baseball from 1914 to 1915. The team's name came from Tip Top Bread, a product of Ward Baking Company, which was also owned by team owner Robert Ward. They were sometimes informally called the Brooklyn Feds or BrookFeds due to being the Brooklyn team of the Federal League. They played in Washington Park, which the Brooklyn Dodgers had abandoned after the 1912 season to move to Ebbets Field.

History

The team finished a disappointing 4th in 1914. Federal League officials believed it was important to have a successful franchise in the New York City area and when the Indianapolis Hoosiers were transitioned to Newark, New Jersey, the "Federal League Ty Cobb", as 1914 FL batting champ Benny Kauff was known, was placed on the Brooklyn roster. In 1915, Kauff led the league with a .342 batting average and 55 stolen bases, but the Tip-Tops still finished in seventh place. The Newark and Brooklyn FL teams played three holiday doubleheaders during the 1915 season where one game was in Newark and the second was in Brooklyn.

On September 19, 1914, Tip-Top Ed Lafitte threw the only no-hitter in Federal League history, beating the Kansas City Packers 6–2.

Had the Federal League (FL) lasted just one more season, night baseball might have been introduced two decades earlier. The Tip Tops had announced plans for the 1916 season to play some games at night.

See also
Brooklyn Tip-Tops all-time roster
1914 Brooklyn Tip-Tops season
1915 Brooklyn Tip-Tops season
George S. Ward

References

The Federal League of 1914–1915 by Marc Okkonen.
The Formation, Sometimes Absorption and Mostly Inevitable Demise of 18 Professional Baseball Organizations, 1871 to Present by David Pietrusza.
May the Best Team Win: Baseball Economics and Public Policy by Andrew Zimbalist.
Total Baseball: The Ultimate Baseball Encyclopedia by John Thorn, et al.

External links

Brooklyn Tip-Tops

 
Baseball teams established in 1914
Baseball teams disestablished in 1915
Defunct Major League Baseball teams
Federal League teams
1914 establishments in New York City
1915 disestablishments in New York (state)
Defunct baseball teams in New York (state)